Davis Creek is a tributary of the Kanawha River,  long, in West Virginia in the United States.

Davis Creek flows for its entire length in Kanawha County.

The creek is paralleled by county roads for much of its length, and by West Virginia Route 601 for a portion of its course through South Charleston.  Hiking trails follow the creek in the Kanawha State Forest.

Davis Creek has the name of Thomas Davis, a pioneer settler.

See also
List of rivers of West Virginia

References 

Rivers of West Virginia
Rivers of Kanawha County, West Virginia
Tributaries of the Kanawha River